Cherie Buckner-Webb (born October 29, 1951) is a Democratic politician from Boise, Idaho. In 2010 Buckner-Webb was elected to a single term in the Idaho House of Representatives representing the north Boise-based District 19. In 2012 Buckner-Webb won the district's Idaho Senate seat, succeeding the retiring Nicole LeFavour. She is Idaho's first elected African-American state legislator, and its first African-American woman legislator.

Upon taking office in the Idaho Senate Buckner-Webb was elected Democratic caucus chair, and she later served as assistant minority leader.

Buckner-Webb did not seek re-election in 2020. Buckner-Webb instead ran for College of Western Idaho Zone 5 Trustee and won unopposed.

Early life and career 
Buckner-Webb earned her bachelor's degree from George Fox University and her master's degree in social work from Northwest Nazarene University. Buckner-Webb made state history when she won the November 2, 2010 general election with 10,196 votes (68.4%) against Jim Morland, becoming Idaho's first elected African American state legislator, and its first African American woman legislator.

Elections

References

External links
Cherie Buckner-Webb at the Idaho Legislature
 

1951 births
African-American state legislators in Idaho
African-American women in politics
George Fox University alumni
Democratic Party Idaho state senators
Living people
Democratic Party members of the Idaho House of Representatives
Northwest Nazarene University alumni
People from Boise, Idaho
Women state legislators in Idaho
21st-century American politicians
21st-century American women politicians
21st-century African-American women
21st-century African-American politicians
20th-century African-American people
20th-century African-American women